Minuscule 119 (in the Gregory-Aland numbering), ε 1290 (Soden), is a Greek minuscule manuscript of the New Testament, on parchment leaves. Palaeographically it has been assigned to the 13th century. It has complex contents with marginalia.

Description 

The codex contains a complete text of the four Gospels on 237 parchment leaves (size ). The text is written in one column per page, 23 lines per page (size of text ). The capital letters in red, the large initial letters in gold.

There is also a division according to the smaller Ammonian Sections (in Mark 236 - 16:12), (no references to the Eusebian Canons).

Text 

The Greek text of the codex is a representative of the Byzantine text-type. Aland placed it in Category V.

According to Gregory textually it is close to the codex 120.

According to the Claremont Profile Method it belongs to the textual cluster 16 in Luke 1, Luke 10, and Luke 20.
To this cluster belong manuscripts: 16, 217, 330, 491, 578, 693, 1528, and 1588.

History 

The manuscript once belonged to Simon de Colines in 1534. It was examined by Louvois for Ludolph Kuster, Griesbach,
and Paulin Martin. C. R. Gregory saw it in 1885.

It is currently housed at the Bibliothèque nationale de France (Gr. 85), at Paris.

See also 
 List of New Testament minuscules
 Biblical manuscript
 Textual criticism
 Family 1

References

Further reading 

 J. J.  Griesbach, Symbolae criticae ad supplendas et corrigendas variarum N. T. lectionum collectiones (Halle, 1793), p. CXLVIII f.

Greek New Testament minuscules
13th-century biblical manuscripts
Bibliothèque nationale de France collections